Robert Lee Watt (born January 15, 1948) is an American horn player and the first African-American French hornist hired by a major symphony orchestra in the United States.

Born in Neptune Township, New Jersey, his father was a jazz trumpet player who did not approve of his choice of instrument—feeling Watt's background and race would make a career with the horn impossible. Nevertheless, Watt won a scholarship to the New England Conservatory of Music in Boston and continued studies at California Institute of the Arts.

In 1970 at the age of twenty-two he was hired by Zubin Mehta and the Los Angeles Philharmonic to play assistant principal horn where he remained for 37 years before retiring in 2008.

References

External links
 
 

American classical horn players
Living people
American jazz horn players
California Institute of the Arts alumni
Boston Conservatory at Berklee alumni
20th-century classical musicians
20th-century American musicians
21st-century classical musicians
21st-century American musicians
1948 births
People from Neptune Township, New Jersey
Classical musicians from New Jersey
20th-century African-American musicians
21st-century African-American musicians